Devonshire Cougars is a football club based in Devonshire, Bermuda  and are in the Bermudian Premier Division league. Team colours are Green and Yellow. They are also known as the "Big Cats".

History

The club has won the Bermudian league title 4 times, in 2005, 2007, 2009 and 2013. They won their most recent title in March 2013 when Somerset Eagles beat Cougars' final challengers North Village Rams to pull them out of the title race.

In the 2009–10 season, Devonshire Cougars won their first FA Cup after defeating the Somerset Eagles 2–2.  Cougars found themselves trailing at the interval after conceding two goals in as many minutes just before halftime.  Player/coach Kwame Steede pulled one goal back for the Cougars in normal time and Darius Cox's hopeful punt from the halfway line completed a dramatic injury time comeback.  The match was decided in a penalty shootout, where the Cougars bested the Eagles 5–4.  The Eagles fell behind in the shootout when their second penalty, taken by Damon Swan, was saved by goalkeeper Ricardo Brangman. Damico Coddington converted the fifth and final spot kick to secure Cougars maiden FA Cup final triumph.

In the 2010–11 season, the power house Devonshire Cougars Started and ended the season off on a high beating Dandy Town Hornets in the beginning of the season, for the charity Cup. In the final stage of the season the Big Cats showed their ability in the last game of the season, once again sealing the FA Cup defeating Rangers at the National Sports Centre. Critics say that it was the Tumaini Steede show at National Sports Centre as the youngster struck a brace to help Devonshire Cougars successfully defend their FA Cup with a comfortable 4–1 win over Southampton Rangers. Jesse Seymour and youngster Lejuan Simmons also scored for the champions, while Travis Wilkinson scored a consolation goal for Rangers. Having been beaten the weekend before at the same venue in the Friendship Cup to North Village, the FA Cup final was to be no repeat of their last outing.

On 4 July 2012 they lost Bermudian international Tumaini Steede in a bike accident, with coach Dennis Brown citing the 2012/13 season would be dedicated to Steede. They also considered to retire Steede's number 10 shirt.

Achievements
Cingular Wireless Premier Division: 4
 2004/05, 2006/07, 2008/09, 2012/13

FA Challenge Cup: 3
 2009/10 2010/11 2012/13

Bermuda Charity Shield: 2
 2006/07 2010/11

Bermuda Friendship Trophy: 2
 2004/05 2012/13

Bermuda Martonmere Cup: 3
 2001/02, 2006/07, 2008/09

Bermuda Dudley Eve Trophy: 2
 2005/06  2016/17

Players

Current squad
 For 2015–2016 season

Staff and board members
 President:  Mark Steede
 Vice President/Treasurer:  Delroy Musson
 Secretary:   Shanika Hayward
 Assistant Secretary: Iresah Samuels

Sponsors
Mussenden Subair Limited (2012–Present)
Burt Construction Ltd. (2009–2012)
Matches Lane (2009/10)
Twist Trucking (2009/10)

Historical list of coaches

 Devarr Boyles (Mar 2010 – Jun 2010)
 Dennis Brown (2011 – Apr 2014)
 Andrew Bascome (Sep 2014 – Aug 2015)
 Kwame Steede (2015–2016)
 Omar Butterfield (Mar 2016 – January 2019)
 Vance Brown (January 2019 – present)

References

External links
 Club page – Bermuda FA

Football clubs in Bermuda
Devonshire Parish